Ross Harris (born 16 April 1985 in Glasgow) is a former Scottish footballer.

He previously played for Celtic, where he did not make any first team appearances, and Dundee, and Stirling Albion in August 2007. He joined Albion Rovers in August 2008 and played for them for one season.

References

External links
 (pre-Albion)
 (Albion)

1985 births
Living people
Footballers from Glasgow
Scottish footballers
Association football midfielders
Celtic F.C. players
Dundee F.C. players
Stirling Albion F.C. players
Albion Rovers F.C. players
Scottish Football League players